Leslie St Auburn Reifer (born 5 September 1989) is a Barbadian cricket umpire. His father Leslie Reifer played for Barbados during the 1970s and 1980s.

He stood as an umpire in his first Twenty20 International (T20I) match between India and the West Indies at Central Broward Regional Park, Lauderhill, Florida on 28 August 2016. He stood as an umpire in his first One Day International (ODI) match between the West Indies and Afghanistan at the Darren Sammy National Cricket Stadium, Gros Islet on 14 June 2017. However, the match was washed out with no result. In January 2020, he was named as one of the sixteen umpires for the 2020 Under-19 Cricket World Cup tournament in South Africa.

See also
 List of One Day International cricket umpires
 List of Twenty20 International cricket umpires

References

1989 births
Living people
Barbadian cricket umpires
People from Saint George, Barbados
West Indian One Day International cricket umpires
West Indian Twenty20 International cricket umpires